The Arrows  were a band based in London, England. The group, which formed in 1974 and disbanded in 1977, included American singer/bassist Alan Merrill, American guitarist Jake Hooker and English drummer Paul Varley (original drummer Clive Williams was replaced by Paul Varley). They had UK chart hit singles in 1974 and 1975 with "Touch Too Much" and "My Last Night with You", produced by Mickie Most on RAK Records. They wrote and recorded the original version of "I Love Rock 'n' Roll", later covered by Joan Jett & the Blackhearts.

Career
The Arrows had two 14-week television shows in the UK called Arrows in 1976 and 1977, which were broadcast on Granada Television and produced by Muriel Young. They are the only band to have two weekly TV series and no records released during the run of either series;  a result of a conflict between the band's manager Ian Wright of the M.A.M. Agency, and the group's mentor/producer Mickie Most. Each series consisted of 14 shows, 30 minutes in length. There were 28 shows broadcast in total. Their final single, "Once Upon a Time", was released one month before the first show of their first series in 1976. Joan Jett became aware of "I Love Rock 'n' Roll" while on tour with her band the Runaways in England in 1976 and saw the group perform the song on their weekly show.

The band's only US TV appearance was on Don Kirshner's Rock Concert in February 1975. They played their UK hits, "Touch Too Much" and "Toughen Up".

The first manager of The Arrows was Peter Meaden, who had also managed The Who in the early 1960s. He came up with the band's name, which originates from The Who's logo, with the arrow pointing up.

One of Liverpool's most renowned Beatles biographers and editor of 1960s British invasion bible Mersey Beat, Bill Harry wrote his first published book about the Arrows, Arrows : The Official Story, published on Everest books in 1976.

Terry Taylor who joined the band in the autumn of 1976 for the band's second weekly TV series, is currently with Bill Wyman's Rhythm Kings band.

The band's second single "Toughen Up" made number 51 in the UK chart in 1974.
That year Arrows won the Golden Lion award (Belgium) in the "best new band" category and performed at the ceremonies on Belgian television.

The Arrows highest reaching chart hit was "Touch Too Much" in 1974 which went to number 2 in the South African charts and was in the top 20 there for 15 weeks.

Arrows are the only band in the history to have hit records before their weekly TV series, and no records released during the run of their two television series. The band's last single was released a month before their first TV show was broadcast.

The Arrows song "Moving Next Door to You" (composed by Alan Merrill and Jake Hooker) was used on the BBC1 TV show Homes Under The Hammer series 18,  episode 70. The song was the B-side of "My Last Night with You", produced by Mickie Most in 1975. After that, the BBC TV show used the Arrows song "We Can Make It Together" in series 19, episode 53, the b-side of the band's single "Touch Too Much".

The Arrows album First Hit was reissued in Japan on 11 March 2015, with bonus tracks on Warner Brothers Japan.

The Arrows founding band members Paul Varley (1952 – 2008), Jake Hooker (1953 – 2014) and Alan Merrill (1951 – 2020) are all deceased.
Eamonn Carr of later Freddie + The Dreamers/St Cecilia  fame toured as piano/keys player for The Arrows live performances.

Discography

Album
 First Hit (1976), Rak Records

Archival releases
 1998 First Hit (reissue with bonus tracks) - CD
 2001 Singles Collection Plus 
 2002 Tawny Tracks 
 2004 A's B's and Rarities
 2015 First Hit (Japanese reissue with bonus tracks)

Singles

List of songs 
The following is a sortable table of all songs by Arrows:

Cover versions

Arrow songs covered by others

References

External links
 
 Arrows fan site
 The Arrows Show
 The Arrows unofficial website
 Arrows in the UK charts

1974 establishments in England
1977 disestablishments in England
English pop music groups
English glam rock groups
Musical groups from London
Musical groups established in 1974
Musical groups disestablished in 1977
Rak Records artists